The 2017–18 season was Karpaty Lviv's 25th season in the top Ukrainian football league. Karpaty competed in Premier League and Ukrainian Cup.

Players

Squad information

Transfers

In

Out

Pre-season and friendlies

Competitions

Overall

Premier League

League table

Relegation round

Results summary

Results by round

Matches

 Match suspended after 1st half due to adverse weather conditions. 2nd half played on February 21

Relegation round

Ukrainian Cup

Statistics

Appearances and goals

|-
! colspan=14 style=background:#dcdcdc; text-align:center| Goalkeepers

|-
! colspan=14 style=background:#dcdcdc; text-align:center| Defenders

|-
! colspan=14 style=background:#dcdcdc; text-align:center| Midfielders 

|-
! colspan=14 style=background:#dcdcdc; text-align:center| Forwards

|-
! colspan=14 style=background:#dcdcdc; text-align:center| Players transferred out during the season

Last updated: 19 May 2018

Goalscorers

Last updated: 19 May 2018

Clean sheets

Last updated: 19 May 2018

Disciplinary record

Last updated: 19 May 2018

Hudyma vs Karpaty 
Back in 2014 a former player of Karpaty Volodymyr Hudyma filed a case against FC Karpaty Lviv to the FFU Chamber of Disputes for failing the club to pay his salary and won it. Since 2017 Karpaty filed three counter cases against Hudyma and FFU (accusing the later of siding with the player) through regular local court. Karpaty continuously ignore the FIFA and the UEFA norms where it is prohibited of handling the cases in sport nature in courts of general jurisdiction. In 2017 FFU in ultimatum form forced Karpaty to withdraw one of its cases or the club would have been stripped of professional status. At first Karpaty withdrew its appeal, but later filed it again. On 21 April 2017 the FFU Appeals Committee stated that the club has to pay its player the debt until 15 May 2017. On 24 November 2017 Karpaty lost its case against Hudyma in the Court of Arbitration for Sport. On 21 December 2017 the FFU Control and Disciplinary Committee stripped Karpaty of three tournament points, but the initiative was never implemented by the Ukrainian Premier League.

Volodymyr Hudyma is not the only victim whom Karpaty never paid salary in full. Among other players is the Karpaty's caps leader Ihor Khudobyak whom the club did not even allowed to leave.

On 6 March 2018 it was announced that with mediation from the president of FC Rukh Vynnyky Hryhoriy Kozlovskyi, Volodymyr Hudyma withdrew all his grievances against Karpaty Lviv and personally asked the Football Federation of Ukraine not to impose sanctions against the Lviv's club.

References

External links 
Official website

Karpaty Lviv
FC Karpaty Lviv seasons